Stefan Tasev was a Bulgarian officer, major general of infantry, Head of 7th Rila Infantry Division in World War I and after the war was the of 1st Infantry Division in Sofia.

Biography
Stefan Tasev was born on November 17, 1866 in Gorna Oryahovitsa. On June 6, 1884, he enlisted in the Bulgarian Land Forces. In 1885 he graduated from the Military School of His Princely Highness in Sofia, and on December 21 he was promoted to the rank of lieutenant and enlisted in the infantry. On June 17, 1888 he was promoted to the rank of lieutenant, and in 1892 to the rank of captain. In 1900 he served as a senior officer in the Vasil Levski National Military University, and from 1903 he was company commander in the same. On August 2, 1903 he was promoted to the rank of major , and on May 13, 1908 to the rank of lieutenant colonel . In 1909 and appointed chief of 25 o Regimental Military District, and from 1911 was commander of the 26th Pernik Regiment.

Balkan Wars
During the First Balkan War, Stefan Tasev served as commander of the 12th Infantry Regiment and May 18, 1913 was promoted to colonel .

On March 9, 1914 he was appointed head of the Vasil Levski National Military University, a position he held until September 10, 1915.

World War I
During World War I, Tasev was head of the 7th Rila Infantry Division from June 29, 1917 to September 30, 1918. On August 15, 1917, he was promoted to the rank of Major General  In 1918 he was chief of the occupation troops in the Moravian region. After the war, he was appointed head of the 1st Infantry Division in Sofia. In 1919 he joined the reserve.s

On June 25, 1920, he was appointed Assistant Director General of Labor , and 3 days later took office.

Awards
Order of Bravery, III degree, 2nd class
Order of Saint Alexander, III and IV degree with swords in the middle
Order of Military Merit, 5th class on a plain ribbon

References

Bibliography
 Nedev, S., The Command of the Bulgarian Army during the Wars of National Unification, Sofia, 1993, Military Publishing Complex "St. George the Victorious ”, p. 178
 Yotov, Petko , Dobrev, Angel, Milenov, Blagoy. The Bulgarian Army in the First World War (1915 - 1918): A Short Encyclopedic Reference Book, Sofia, Publishing House "St. George the Victorious", 1995

Bulgarian generals
Bulgarian military personnel of the Balkan Wars
People from Gorna Oryahovitsa
1866 births
Bulgarian military personnel of World War I
20th-century Bulgarian politicians
Year of death missing